Juddmonte Farms is a horse breeding farm, owned until his death on 12th January 2021 by Prince Khalid bin Abdullah of Saudi Arabia.

Overview
Juddmonte Farms consists of a variety of individual farms: four in England, two in Ireland, and two in Kentucky, United States. Established in 1977, Juddmonte in particular is highly regarded for their 200 plus broodmare band. The farm has owned five horses named Broodmare of the Year in the U.S. or Britain: Slightly Dangerous, dam of stakes winners Commander in Chief, Warning, Yashmak, Dushyantor and Jibe; Hasili, dam of stakes winners Dansili, Banks Hill, Intercontinental, Heat Haze, Cacique and Champs Elysees; Toussaud, dam of stakes winners Empire Maker, Chester House, Honest Lady, Chiselling and Decarchy; Arrive, dam of Visit and Promising Lead; Binche, dam of Byword and Proviso; and Concentric, dam of Enable.

The farm's first major victory was in 1980 when Known Fact won the 2,000 Guineas, the first win in that 200-year-old event for any Arab racing owner.

In Europe, Juddmonte currently stands at stud the stallions Bated Breath, Expert Eye, Frankel, Kingman and Oasis Dream. In the United States, Juddmonte's stallion is Mandaloun, after the death of the prominent Arrogate at age 7.

A number of homebreds have won major races in both in Flat and National Hunt racing after leaving Juddmonte. These include Wicklow Brave, son of Beat Hollow (Vincent O'Brien County Hurdle, The Punchestown Champion Hurdle and Irish St Leger); Prohibit, son of Oasis Dream (King's Stand Stakes); Brian Boru, son of broodmare Eva Luna (Racing Post Trophy and British St Leger); Powerscourt, son of broodmare Rainbow Lake (Tattersalls Gold Cup and Arlington Millions); Foreteller, son of Dansili (Australian Ranvet Stakes, Makybe Diva Stakes and Underwood Stakes) and Harlem, son of Champs Elysees (Australian Cup).

Awards
Juddmonte Farms has over the years won a variety of awards related to horse racing. In the United States this includes 16 Eclipse Awards to date, which includes the Top Breeder Award in 1995, 2001, 2002, 2003 and 2009, as well as the Top Owner Award in 1992, 2003, 2016 and 2017. In 2003, they had a win at the Belmont Stakes, with Empire Maker and also had wins in the Breeders' Cup Filly & Mare Turf in 2001, 2005 and 2009 with Banks Hill, Intercontinental and Midday.  They won the Breeders' Cup Classic with Arrogate in 2016, and the Breeders' Cup Mile with Expert Eye and Breeders' Cup Turf with Enable in 2018.

In the United Kingdom, Prince Khalid bin Abdullah has won the British flat racing Champion Owner Title in 2003, 2010 and 2011, with horses such as Oasis Dream, Derby winner Workforce, Byword, Classic winner Special Duty, Timepiece, Twice Over, Midday and 10-time Group 1 winner Frankel, the highest rated thoroughbred racehorse in history. A Champion Owner Title was also achieved in Ireland 1993.

To date, Prince Khalid bin Abdullah and Juddmonte horses have won 21 Cartier Racing Award titles, also known as the European Horse of the Year Awards. Wins include Horse of the Year (Frankel (twice), Kingman, and Enable), Three-Year-Old Colt of the Year (Commander in Chief, Workforce, Frankel and Kingman), Three-Year-Old Filly of the Year (Banks Hill, Enable), Two-Year-Old Colt of the Year (Zafonic, Frankel), Two-Year-Old Filly of the Year (Special Duty), Top Older Horse of the Year (Frankel, Noble Mission, Enable), Top Sprinter of the Year (Oasis Dream) and the Award of Merit.

In France, Prince Khalid bin Abdullah has won the French Champion Owner Title in 2002, 2003, 2006, 2015 and 2017. In Ireland the Champion Owner Title was won in 1993.

Four times, at the end of 2011, 2012 and 2016, a Juddmonte Farms horse has led the IFHA World's Best Racehorse rankings: Frankel in 2011–12 and Arrogate in 2016–17.

Trainers and jockeys

Juddmonte's regular trainers in Britain include Roger Charlton, Charlie Hills, John and Thady Gosden, and Michael Stoute. In 2016, Ralph Beckett and Hugo Palmer became trainers for Juddmonte in Britain following the death of Sir Henry Cecil and the retirement of his wife, Lady Jane Cecil, after a brief but successful career. In 2006, Dermot Weld became a trainer for Juddmonte in Ireland, and Ger Lyons became a Juddmonte trainer in 2018. In France horses are sent to André Fabre, Henri-Francois Devin and Francis-Henri Graffard. Successful horses on the European scene were often sent late in their three-year-old career to Robert J. Frankel in the U.S. for the bigger purse Grade 1 races. In the 1980s, Juddmonte also enjoyed success with Guy Harwood (father of Amanda Perrett) and Jeremy Tree in Britain and with Maurice Zilber in France.

In France former French National Hunt Champion Jockey Vincent Cheminaud is currently retained by Juddmonte. In Britain, Pat Eddery, Richard Hughes and James Doyle have been retained to ride Juddmonte horses in the past. In Ireland, Pat Smullen regularly rode Juddmonte horses.

The Juddmonte Group's CEO is Douglas Erskine Crum. The studs in England are managed by Simon Mockridge, in Ireland by Barry Mahon and in Kentucky by Garrett O'Rourke. Teddy Grimthorpe is employed as Juddmonte's racing manager in Europe, while Garrett O'Rourke is employed as Juddmonte's racing manager in the U.S.

In the United States, Juddmonte horses—including Classic winner Empire Maker, Aptitude, Flute, Heat Haze, First Defence, Ventura, Sightseek, Intercontinental and former European racers such as Beat Hollow and Champs Elysees were trained by Robert Frankel for more than two decades prior to Frankel's death in November, 2009. They are now being trained by Bill Mott, Brad Cox, Bob Baffert and also by former assistant to Robert Frankel, Chad Brown

Major wins

 Great Britain
 1,000 Guineas – Wince (1999), Special Duty (2010)
 2,000 Guineas – Known Fact (1980), Dancing Brave (1986), Zafonic (1993), Frankel (2011)
 Oaks – Reams of Verse (1997), Enable (2017)
 Derby – Quest for Fame (1990), Commander in Chief (1993), Workforce (2010)
 St Leger Stakes – Toulon (1991), Logician (2019)
 St. James's Palace Stakes – Frankel (2011), Kingman (2014)
 Coronation Stakes – Banks Hill (2001)
 Queen Anne Stakes – Rousillon (1985), Warning (1989), Frankel (2012)
 Prince of Wales's Stakes – Two Timing (1989), Placerville (1993), Byword (2010)
 Lockinge Stakes – Frankel (2012)
 Coronation Cup – Rainbow Quest (1985), Sunshack (1995)
 Eclipse Stakes – Dancing Brave (1986), Twice Over (2010), Enable (2019)
 King George VI and Queen Elizabeth Stakes – Dancing Brave (1986), Enable (2017), Enable (2019), Enable (2020)
 Sussex Stakes – Rousillon (1985), Warning (1988), Distant View (1994), Frankel (2011), Frankel (2012), Kingman (2014)
 International Stakes – Twice Over (2011), Frankel (2012)
 Queen Elizabeth II Stakes – Warning (1988), Observatory (2000), Frankel (2011)
 Champion Stakes – Twice Over (2009), Twice Over (2010), Frankel (2012), Noble Mission (2014)
 Falmouth Stakes – Ryafan (1997), Timepiece (2011),
 Nassau Stakes – Ryafan (1997), Midday (2009), Midday (2010), Midday (2011), Winsili (2013)
 Yorkshire Oaks – Quiff (2004), Midday (2010), Enable (2017), Enable (2019)
 Golden Jubilee Stakes – Danehill (1989)
 July Cup – Oasis Dream (2003)
 Nunthorpe Stakes – Oasis Dream (2003)
 Haydock Sprint Cup – Dowsing (1988), Danehill (1989), African Rose (2008)
 Dewhurst Stakes – Zafonic (1992), Xaar (1997), Distant Music (1999), Frankel (2010)
 Racing Post Trophy – Alphabatim (1983), Bakharoff (1985), Armiger (1992), American Post (2003)
 Middle Park Stakes – Known Fact (1979), Oasis Dream (2002)
 Cheveley Park Stakes – Prophecy (1993), Special Duty (2009)
 Fillies' Mile – Reams of Verse (1996)
 Diadem Stakes – Dowsing (1987)

 Ireland
 Irish 2,000 Guineas – Kingman (2014), Siskin (2020)
 Irish Oaks – Wemyss Bight (1993), Bolas (1994), Enable (2017)
 Irish Derby – Commander in Chief (1993), Westover (2022)
 Tattersalls Gold Cup – Noble Mission (2014) 
 Irish Champion Stakes – 3rd General Holme (1983), Damister (1985), Xaar (1998), Twice Over (2010), Famous Name (2011)
 Irish St Leger – 2nd Band (1983)
 Pretty Polly Stakes – Promising Lead (2008)
 Matron Stakes  – Emulous (2011)
 Phoenix Stakes – Digamist (1987)
 National Stakes

 France
 Prix de l'Arc de Triomphe – Rainbow Quest (1985), Dancing Brave (1986), Rail Link (2006), Workforce (2010), Enable (2017, 2018)
 Prix du Jockey Club – Sanglamore (1990), New Bay (2015)
 Prix de Diane – Jolypha (1992), Nebraska Tornado (2003)
 Poule d'Essai des Poulains – American Post (2004)
 Poule d'Essai des Pouliches – Houseproud (1990), Zenda (2002), Special Duty (2010)
 Grand Prix de Paris – Beat Hollow (2000), Rail Link (2006), Zambezi Sun (2007), Flintshire (2013)
 Prix Jean Prat – Mutual Trust (2011)
 Prix d'Astarté – Nashmeel (1987)
 Prix d'Ispahan – Sanglamore (1991), Observatory (2001)
 Grand Prix de Saint-Cloud – Spanish Moon (2009), Noble Mission (2014)
 Prix Jacques Le Marois – Banks Hill (2002), Kingman (2014)
 Prix du Moulin de Longchamp – Rousillon (1985), All At Sea (1992), Nebraska Tornado (2003)
 Prix du Cadran – Reefscape (2005)
 Prix Royal-Oak – Raintrap (1993), Sunshack (1995), Ice Breeze (2017)
 Prix Vermeille – Jolypha (1992), Midday (2010)
 Prix Maurice de Gheest – Interval (1987)
 Prix de la Forêt – Etoile Montante (2003)
 Prix de l'Abbaye de Longchamp
 Prix Morny – Zafonic (1992)
 Prix Jean-Luc Lagardère – Tenby (1992), American Post (2003), Full Mast (2014) 
 Critérium International
 Critérium de Saint-Cloud – Miserdan (1988), Sunshack (1993), Passage of Time (2006) Epicuris (2014)
 Prix Marcel Boussac – Ryafan (1996), Proportional (2008)
 Prix Jean Romanet – Announce (2011), Romantica (2013)

 United States

 Breeders' Cup Classic – Arrogate (2016)
 Breeders' Cup Turf – Enable (2018)
 Breeders' Cup Mile – Expert Eye (2018)
 Breeders' Cup Filly & Mare Turf – Banks Hill (2001), Intercontinental (2005), Midday (2009)
 Breeders' Cup Filly & Mare Sprint – 2nd Ventura (2008)
 Pegasus World Cup – Arrogate (2017)
 Woodford Reserve Turf Classic – Beat Hollow (2002)
 Manhattan Handicap – Beat Hollow (2002), Cacique (2006), Flintshire (2016)
 Charles Whittingham Memorial Handicap – Exbourne (1991), Quest For Fame (1992), Midships (2009)
 United Nations Stakes – Exbourne (1991), Senure (2001)
 Man o' War Stakes – Defensive Play (1990), Cacique (2006)
 Hollywood Gold Cup – Marquetry (1991), Aptitude (2001)
 Eddie Read Handicap – Marquetry (1992), Expelled (1997)
 Arlington Million – Chester House (2000), Beat Hollow (2002)
 Pacific Classic Stakes – Tinners Way (1994), Tinners Way (1995), Skimming (2000), Skimming (2001)
 Jockey Club Gold Cup – Aptitude (2001)
 Clement L. Hirsch Turf Championship Stakes – Senure (2001)
 Shadwell Turf Mile Stakes – Kirkwall (1999)
 Hollywood Turf Cup Stakes – Alphabatim (1984), Alphabatim (1986), Champs Elysees (2008)
 Belmont Stakes – Empire Maker (2003)
 Florida Derby – Empire Maker (2003)
 Wood Memorial Stakes – Empire Maker (2003)
 Jim Dandy Stakes – 2nd Empire Maker (2003)
 Secretariat Stakes – Chiselling (2002)
 Beldame Stakes – Sightseek (2003), Sightseek (2004)
 Gamely Stakes – Tates Creek (2003)
 Humana Distaff Handicap – Sightseek (2003), Paulassilverlining (2017)
 Just A Game Handicap – Intercontinental (2004), Ventura (2008), Proviso (2010), Antonoe (2017)
 Diana Handicap – Tates Creek (2002), Proviso (2010)
 Frank E. Kilroe Mile Handicap – Tychonic (1996), Decarchy (2002) Proviso (2010)
 Beverly D. Stakes – Heat Haze (2003)
 Cotillion Handicap – Close Hatches (2013)
 Yellow Ribbon Stakes – Super Staff (1992), Ryafan (1997), Spanish Fern (1999), Tates Creek (2003), Light Jig (2004)
 Rodeo Drive Stakes – Emollient (2014)
 Flower Bowl Invitational Stakes – Yashmak (1997)
 First Lady Stakes – Intercontinental (2005), Proviso (2010)
 Matriarch Stakes – Wandesta (1996), Ryafan (1997), Heat Haze (2003), Intercontinental (2004), Price Tag (2006), Ventura (2009)
 Kentucky Oaks – Flute (2001)
 Alabama Stakes – Flute (2001)
 Queen Elizabeth II Challenge Cup Stakes – Ryafan (1997)
 Hollywood Derby – Seek Again (2013)
 Sword Dancer Invitational Handicap – Flintshire (2015), Flintshire (2016)
 Travers Stakes – Arrogate (2016)
 Apple Blossom Handicap – Close Hatches (2014)
 Ogden Phipps Handicap – Sightseek (2003), Sightseek (2004), Close Hatches (2014)
 Ashland Stakes – Emollient (2013)
 American Oaks – Emollient (2013)
 Personal Ensign Stakes – Close Hatches (2014)
 Juddmonte Spinster Stakes – Emollient (2013)
 Mother Goose Stakes – Close Hatches (2013)
 San Antonio Handicap – Hatim (1986)
 Vinery Madison Stakes – Paulassliverlining (2017)

 Canada
 Canadian International Stakes – French Glory (1990), Raintrap (1994), Champs Elysees (2009)
 Northern Dancer Breeders' Cup Turf – Champs Elysees (2008), Redwood (2010)
 Woodbine Mile – Ventura (2009)

 Hong Kong
 Hong Kong Mile – 2nd Cityscape (2011)
 Hong Kong Vase – Flintshire (2014)

 United Arab Emirates
 Dubai Duty Free – Cityscape (2012)
 Dubai Sheema Classic – Polish Summer (2004)
 Dubai World Cup – Arrogate (2017)

External link

Most successful horses
Horses managed by Juddmonte listed among their most successful include the following:

 Known Fact (1979–1980) – Middle Park Stakes and 2000 Guineas
 Rainbow Quest (1985) – Coronation Cup and Prix de l'Arc de Triomphe
 Rousillon (1985)  – Queen Anne Stakes, Sussex Stakes and Prix du Moulin (1985)
 Dancing Brave (1986) – 2000 Guineas, Coral Eclipse, King George VI & Queen Elizabeth Stakes and Prix de l'Arc de Triomphe
 Warning (1988–1989) – Sussex Stakes, Queen Elizabeth II Stakes and Queen Anne Stakes
 Danehill (1989) – Golden Jubilee Stakes and Haydock Sprint Cup
 Sanglamore (1990–1991) – Prix du Jockey Club and Prix d'Ispahan
 Quest For Fame (1990–1992) – Derby and Charles Whittingham Memorial Handicap
 Exbourne (1991) – Charles Whittingham Memorial Handicap and United Nation Stakes
 Marquetry (1991–1992) – Hollywood Gold Cup and Eddie Read Handicap
 Jolypha (1992) – Prix de Diane and Prix Vermeille
 Zafonic (1992–1993) – Prix Morny, Dewhurst Stakes and 2000 Guineas
 Commander in Chief (1993) – Derby and Irish Derby
 Raintrap (1993–1994) – Prix Royal Oak and Canadian International
 Sun Shack (1993–1997) – Critérium de Saint-Cloud, Coronation Cup and Prix Royal Oak
 Ryafan (1996–1997) – Prix Marcel Boussac, Falmouth Stakes, Nassau Stakes, Queen Elizabeth II Challenge Cup, Yellow Ribbon Stakes and Matriarch Stakes
 Reams of Verse (1996–1997) – Fillies' Mile and Oaks
 Aptitude (2000–2001) – Hollywood Gold Cup and Jockey Club Gold Cup
 Observatory (2000–2001) – Queen Elizabeth II Stakes and Prix d'Ispahan
 Beat Hollow (2000–2002) – Grand Prix de Paris, Woodford Reserve Turf Classic, Manhattan Handicap and Arlington Million
 Senure (2001) – United Nations Handicap and Clement L Hirsch Memorial Turf
 Flute (2001) – Kentucky Oaks and Alabama Stakes
 Banks Hill (2001–2002) – Coronation Stakes, Breeders' Cup Filly and Mare Turf and Prix Jacques Le Marois
 Oasis Dream (2002–2003) – Middle Park Stakes, July Cup and Nunthorpe Stakes
 Tates Creek (2002–2003) – Diana Handicap, Gamely Stakes and Yellow Ribbon Stakes
 Empire Maker (2003) – Florida Derby, Wood Memorial Stakes and Belmont Stakes
 Heat Haze (2003) – Beverly D Stakes and Matriarch Stakes
 Nebraska Tornado (2003) – Prix de Diane and Prix du Moulin
 Étoile Montante (2003–2004) – Prix de la Forêtt
 American Post (2003–2004) – Prix Jean Luc Lagardère, Racing Post Trophy and Poule d'Essai des Poulains
 Intercontinental (2004–2005) – Just A Game Stakes, Matriarch Stakes, First Lady Stakes and Breeders' Cup Filly and Mare Turf
 Cacique (2006) – Manhattan Handicap and Man o'War Stakes
 Rail Link (2006) – Grand Prix de Paris and Prix de l'Arc de Triomphe
 Champs Elysees (2008–2009) – Northern Dancer Turf Stakes, Hollywood Turf Cup and Canadian International Stakes
 Ventura (2008–2009) – Just A Game Stakes, Breeders' Cup Filly & Mare Sprint, Santa Monica Handicap, Woodbine Mile and Matriarch Stakes
 Midday (2009–2011) – Nassau Stakes (three times), Breeders' Cup Filly & Mare Turf, Yorkshire Oaks and Prix Vermeille
 Twice Over (2009–2011) – Champion Stakes (twice), Eclipse Stakes and Juddmonte International
 Special Duty (2009–2010) – Cheveley Park Stakes, 1000 Guineas and Poule d'Essai des Pouliches
 Proviso (2010) – Frank E Kilroe Mile Handicap, Just A Game Stakes, Diana Stakes and First Lady Stakes
 Workforce (2010) – Derby and Prix de l'Arc de Triomphe
 Frankel (2010–2012) – Dewhurst Stakes, 2000 Guineas, St James's Palace Stakes, Sussex Stakes (twice), Queen Elizabeth II Stakes, Lockinge Stakes, Queen Anne Stakes, Juddmonte International and Champion Stakes
 Emollient (2013–2014) – Ashland Stakes, American Oaks, Juddmonte Spinster Stakes and Rodeo Drive Stakes
 Close Hatches (2013–2014) – Mother Goose Stakes, Cotillion Stakes, Personal Ensign Stakes, Apple Blossom Handicap and Ogden Phipps Handicap
 Noble Mission (2014) – Irish Tattersalls Gold Cup, Grand Prix De Saint–Cloud and Champion Stakes
 Flintshire (2013–2016) – Grand Prix de Paris, Hong Kong Vase, Sword Dancer Invitational Stakes, Woodford Reserve Manhattan Stakes and Sword Dancer Invitational Stakes
 Kingman (2014) – Irish 2000 Guineas, St James's Palace Stakes, Sussex Stakes and Prix Jacques Le Marois
 Arrogate (2016–2017) – Travers Stakes, Breeders' Cup Classic, Pegasus World Cup and Dubai World Cup 
 Enable (2017-2020) – Oaks, Irish Oaks, Eclipse Stakes, King George & Queen Elizabeth Stakes (three times), Yorkshire Oaks (twice), Prix de l'Arc de Triomphe (twice) and Breeders' Cup Turf

References

External links
 
 
 

Companies established in 1977
Horse farms in Kentucky
Companies based in Lexington, Kentucky
Newmarket, Suffolk
Racehorse owners and breeders
Eclipse Award winners
Saudi Arabian racehorse owners and breeders
Buildings and structures in Lexington, Kentucky
1977 establishments in Kentucky